Zenaida Alexandrovna von Minkwitz (Зинаида Александровна фон Минквиц) (1878-1918), was a Russian Empire botanist noted for her study of the flora of Kazakhstan.

References

1878 births
1918 deaths
Women botanists
Botanists from the Russian Empire